Hohe Karlsschule (Karl's High School) was the strict military academy founded by Karl Eugen, Duke of Württemberg in Stuttgart, Germany. It was first founded in 1770 as a military orphanage, but then converted into a military academy in 1773 for the duke.

Politically the duke was quite unimportant and with this school he wanted to enhance his prestige. In 1770, it was moved to Castle Solitude, and in 1775 into the city.  Raised in 1781 by Emperor Joseph II to university status under the name Karls Hohe Schule, it was disbanded after the death of Duke Carl Eugen by his brother Ludwig Eugen, Duke of Württemberg in 1794. The building, situated behind Neues Schloss, was destroyed in World War II.

Alumni
Friedrich Schiller was one of its alumni. He spent eight years of his life in this academy and suffered a lot in his first years of his stay. At first he was considered an average student, but in his second year, he often became ill and his performance suffered. When he joined the school's medical faculty, his life took a turn for the better and Schiller began with poetry.

Others were Johann Heinrich Dannecker (later professor there), Joseph Anton Koch, Johann Georg Kerner, Johann Heinrich Ferdinand Autenrieth, Philipp Jakob Scheffauer, Johann Rudolf Zumsteeg, Antonio Boroni, Ferdinando Mazzanti, Ludwig Abeille, Johann Gottlieb Sämann, Christian Zais, Adam Albert von Neipperg, Gottlieb Schick, Georges Cuvier, Johann Christoph Friedrich Haug, Nikolaus Friedrich von Thouret, Johann Friedrich LeBret, Karl Wilhelm Marschall von Bieberstein, Ernst Franz Ludwig Marschall von Bieberstein, Friedrich August Marschall von Bieberstein, Friedrich Fürst von Hohenzollern-Hechingen, Carl Friedrich Kielmeyer and Carl Degenkolb.

Notes

External links 
 Karlsschule im Schiller-Film gedreht 1923 von Curt Goetz
 Die Akademiegebäude
 Schiller in der Karlsschule

1770 establishments in the Holy Roman Empire
Educational institutions established in 1770
Educational institutions disestablished in the 1790s
1794 disestablishments in the Holy Roman Empire
Stuttgart
Education in Stuttgart
 
Buildings and structures in Stuttgart